Skandia is an insurance company.

Skandia may also refer to:

 Skandia Township, Marquette County, Michigan
 Skandia Township, Murray County, Minnesota
 Skandia Township, Barnes County, North Dakota
 Skandia (1996 yacht)
 Skandia (2003 yacht)

See also 
 Scandia (disambiguation)
 Skandia PGA Open, a golf tournament played annually in Sweden from 2001 to 2005
 Skandia, a locale in the Ranger's Apprentice by Australian author John Flanagan